Skimmer may refer to:

Animals 
Skimmer (bird), a common name for birds in the genus Rynchops
Skimmer (dragonfly), a common name for dragonflies in the family Libellulidae
Water strider or skimmer, a common name for insects in the family Gerridae
Atlantic surf clam or skimmer, a species of mollusc

Other uses 
Skimmer (band), an English pop-punk band
Skimmer (device), for getting data from a credit card for later fraudulent use
Skimmer (machine), for removing oil from a water surface
Protein skimmer or foam fractionator, a device used mostly in saltwater aquaria
Skimmer (dinghy), an American sailboat design from 1933
A type of hovercar in the Star Trek and other science fiction series
Skimmer (hat)
Skimmer (reader), in speed reading
Skimmer (utensil), a flat, sieve-like scoop or spoon

See also
 Skim (disambiguation)
 Skipper (disambiguation)

Animal common name disambiguation pages